This is a list of the Puerto Rico national football team results from 2008 to the present day.

2008

Friendly

2010 FIFA World Cup qualification First Round

2010 FIFA World Cup qualification Second Round

2011

2014 FIFA World Cup qualification Second Round

2012

Friendly matches

2012 Caribbean Championship qualification First Round

2012 Caribbean Championship qualification Second Round

2014

2014 Caribbean Cup qualification First Round

2015

Friendly matches

 1 : Non FIFA 'A' international match

2018 FIFA World Cup qualification Second Round

2016

Friendly matches

 1 : Non FIFA 'A' international match

2017 Caribbean Cup qualification First Round

2017 Caribbean Cup qualification Second Round

2017 Caribbean Cup qualification Third Round

2017

Friendly matches

 1 : Non FIFA 'A' international match

2018

2019–20 CONCACAF Nations League qualifying

2019

2019–20 CONCACAF Nations League qualifying

2019–20 CONCACAF Nations League

Friendly matches

2021

Friendly matches

2022 FIFA World Cup qualification First Round

2022

results
National association football team results